Boenasa nigrorosea is a moth of the subfamily Arctiinae. It is found on Haiti and the Dominican Republic.

References

Lithosiini